Sakari Markus Oramo,  (born 26 October 1965) is a Finnish conductor. He is chief conductor of the BBC Symphony Orchestra.

Biography and career
Oramo was born in Helsinki and started his career as a violinist and concertmaster of the Finnish Radio Symphony Orchestra.  In 1989, he enrolled in Jorma Panula's conducting class at the Sibelius Academy.  In 1993, just one year after completing the course, he stood in for a sick conductor with the Finnish Radio Symphony Orchestra. This led to his appointment as co-principal conductor. Oramo has also worked with Finland's Avanti! ensemble.  Oramo became principal guest conductor of the Ostrobothnian Chamber Orchestra in 1995, and one of its principal conductors in 2009. In 2013, he became the orchestra's artistic director.

In September 1996, Oramo was named principal conductor of the City of Birmingham Symphony Orchestra (CBSO), having conducted the CBSO in two concerts prior to that appointment.  He then assumed the post of music director and artistic advisor in 1998.  His work in Birmingham included the Floof! festival of contemporary music.  He also championed the music of John Foulds in concerts and recordings with the CBSO.  From 2003 to 2012, Oramo was sole principal conductor of the Finnish Radio Symphony Orchestra.

Oramo was at the forefront of the Edward Elgar sesquicentenary celebrations in 2007, and was awarded the Elgar Medal in 2008 for his efforts in advancing Elgar's music.  In 2008, Oramo stepped down as the CBSO's music director and became the orchestra's principal guest conductor for the 2008–2009 season.

In April 2007, Oramo was one of eight conductors of British orchestras to endorse the 10-year classical music outreach manifesto, "Building on Excellence: Orchestras for the 21st Century", to increase the presence of classical music in the UK, including giving free entry to all British schoolchildren to a classical music concert.  In addition to his conducting and recording work, Oramo has also published newspaper articles on music.

In September 2008, Oramo became chief conductor and artistic advisor of the Royal Stockholm Philharmonic Orchestra.  His initial contract in Stockholm was for three years.  With the Royal Stockholm Philharmonic, he has recorded symphonies of Robert Schumann.  In 2011, Oramo's contract with the Royal Stockholm Philharmonic was extended to 2015.  In April 2016, his Stockholm contract was further extended to 2021.  He concluded his chief conductorship of the Royal Stockholm Philharmonic at the close of the 2020–2021 season.  He has made commercial recordings with the Royal Stockholm Philharmonic for such labels as BIS.

In October 2011, Oramo made his first guest conducting appearance with the BBC Symphony Orchestra (BBC SO), his first guest-conducting engagement with any London orchestra.  On the basis of this concert, in February 2012, Oramo was named the 13th chief conductor of the BBC SO, effective with the First Night of the 2013 Proms season.  His initial contract was for 3 years, with a pending subsequent option for an additional 2 years.  Oramo held the title of chief conductor designate for the 2012–2013 season.  In September 2015, the BBC SO announced the extension of his contract to the 2019–2020 season.  In May 2018, the BBC SO indicated a further extension of Oramo's contract through 2022.  In October 2020, the BBC SO announced a further extension of Oramo's contract as chief conductor through September 2023, the scheduled conclusion of the 2023 Proms season.  In April 2022, the BBC SO announced an additional extension of Oramo's contract as its chief conductor through the end of the 2025–2026 season.  He has recorded commercially with the BBC SO with such labels as harmonia mundi and Chandos, including the second commercial recording of William Alwyn's Miss Julie.

Oramo is married to the Finnish soprano Anu Komsi, and they have two sons, Taavi and Leevi.  In May 2009, Oramo was awarded an honorary OBE for services to music in Birmingham.  Oramo and Komsi, together with Annika Mylläri and Robert McLoud, founded West Coast Kokkola Opera in 2004. Oramo serves as its vice chairman and principal conductor.  In March 2017, the Sibelius Academy announced the appointment of Oramo as professor of orchestral training and orchestral conducting, with a contract scheduled from 1 January 2020 through 31 December 2024.

References

External links
 Sakari Oramo biography at HarrisonParrott Agency
 Royal Stockholm Philharmonic / Konserthus Swedish-language page on Sakari Oramo
 Sakari Oramo biography at Hyperion Records
 Sakari Oramo biography at Ondine Records
 Sakari Oramo biography at Warner Classics

1965 births
Finnish conductors (music)
Honorary Officers of the Order of the British Empire
Living people
Sibelius Academy alumni
Concertmasters
Finnish expatriates in the United Kingdom
People of the Royal Stockholm Philharmonic Orchestra
20th-century conductors (music)
21st-century conductors (music)
20th-century Finnish male musicians
21st-century Finnish male musicians
21st-century classical violinists
Finnish expatriates in Sweden